Inabel, sometimes referred to as Abel Iloco or simply Abel, is a weaving tradition native to the Ilocano people of Northern Luzon in the Philippines. The textile it produces is sought after in the fashion and interior design industries due to its softness, durability, suitability in tropical climates, and for its austere design patterns.

Due to the rarity of skilled weavers and the rarity of raw materials such as handspun cotton thread, the textile has become rare, although weaving communities still persist in the towns of Bangar in La Union; Santiago, Santa, Bantay, and Vigan in Ilocos Sur; and Pinili, Paoay, and Sarrat in Ilocos Norte.

The term is derived from the local verb for "weave", "abel" and the Ilocano noun "inabel," describing any kind of woven fabric. It has since been adapted to refer to the specific kind of textile indigenous to the Ilocos region.

See also
Abacá
Batik
Piña
Malong
Tapis
T'nalak

References 

Philippine clothing
Philippine handicrafts